Shakespeare in the Park is a term for outdoor festivals featuring productions of William Shakespeare's plays. The term originated with the New York Shakespeare Festival in New York City's Central Park, originally created by Joseph Papp. This concept has been adapted by many theatre companies, and over time, this name has expanded to encompass outdoor theatre productions of the playwright's works performed all over the world.

Shakespeare in the Park started as an idea to make theatre available to people of all walks of life, so that it would be as readily available as library books. The performances are more often than not free admission to the general public, usually presented outdoors as a summer event. These types of performances can be seen by audiences around the world, with most festivals adapting the name for their productions, such as Vancouver's Bard on the Beach. Many festivals incorporate workshops, food, and other additions to the performances making this type of theatre experience an interactive community event.

United States

Albuquerque
The New Mexico Shakespeare Festival is a professional festival presented by the Vortex Theatre and the City of Albuquerque. It is one of only 14 free Shakespeare festivals in the nation. The festival is performed at the Veterans Memorial Park each summer by a professional company.

Asheville
The Montford Park Players, a community theater company, has been staging free Shakespeare productions in Asheville, North Carolina since 1973. The productions were first staged at a municipal park on Montford Avenue and, in 1993, moved to its current location, the Hazel Robinson Amphitheatre.

Boston
Commonwealth Shakespeare Company presents professional productions of Shakespeare in Boston Common. The first production was in 1996 at Copley Square; a year later the program was moved to the Commons, first at the Parkman Bandstand and more recently at the Parade Ground.

Buffalo
Shakespeare in Delaware Park describes itself as the United States' 2nd oldest Shakespeare festival (following New York Shakespeare Festival). It is held in Buffalo, New York's Delaware Park.

Dallas
Inspired by the New York Shakespeare Festival, Robert "Bob" Glenn started The Shakespeare Festival of Dallas in 1971 as a free summer Shakespeare Festival. Renamed  Shakespeare Dallas in 2005, the company produces three free Shakespeare productions each summer at the Samuel-Grand Amphitheatre in Lakewood.

Denver
The Foothills Theatre Company has been staging Shakespeare productions every summer since 2014 in Clement Park, located in Littleton, a suburb SW of Denver.

Johnstown 
Band of Brothers Shakespeare company has been producing Shakespeare plays every year in Stackhouse Park since 1992, under the direction of Laura Gordon with a rotating cast of community members of all ages.

Jersey City
The Hudson Shakespeare Company, founded by L. Robert Johnson in 1992, features a summer season where the company stages productions for each month of the summer. Besides Shakespeare standards such as Hamlet and A Midsummer Night's Dream, they often produce one to two lesser done productions a season such as The Two Noble Kinsmen, Cardenio and Henry VIII. Based in Jersey City, NJ, they also tour as part of their summer season to other New Jersey locations such as Fort Lee, Hackensack, Kenilworth, Hoboken, West Milford and also to Stratford, CT.

Kansas City
The Heart of America Shakespeare Festival was founded by Tony winning Broadway producer Marilyn Strauss in 1993 at the urging of Joe Papp with a production of The Tempest in Southmoreland Park. In 1998, they began to produce two productions per year, with a total of 23 production at the start of the 2011 season.

Louisville
Kentucky Shakespeare Festival is a non-profit, professional theatre company in Louisville, Kentucky that produces and performs the works of William Shakespeare. The main productions offered are the annual summer series of plays presented free to the public at Central Park. This series, commonly called "Shakespeare in Central Park", sprung from an initial production in the park by The Carriage House Players in the summer of 1960. They also perform shows in other venues, as well as conduct educational programs related to acting and other theater-related skills.

Miami
The Florida Shakespeare Theater is the only Shakespeare company on the planet that produces Shakespeare in the Park in mid winter. Every January, since 2005, the Florida Shakespeare Theater presents free Shakespeare in the Park productions in Miami-Dade, Broward and Palm Beach counties.  Noted for their educational programming and public outreach, the FST fulfills their mission of providing open and equal access to classical theater.

Minneapolis/St. Paul
Classical Actors Ensemble has performed free outdoor Shakespeare in metro parks each summer since 2014 as well as touring educational productions into secondary schools each spring.

Nashville
The Nashville Shakespeare Festival presents free Summer Shakespeare productions in Nashville, Tennessee and Franklin, Tennessee every year in August and September. Winter Shakespeare takes place in January and February and often focuses on Shakespeare's works that are studied in schools across Tennessee. Founded in 1988, NSF has focused on making Shakespeare accessible to all communities through free and reduced-price tickets and rich educational offerings.

New York City 

The original Shakespeare in the Park was founded in 1954 by Joseph Papp as the New York Shakespeare Festival, which eventually led to free public performances in Central Park. Since 1961 an outdoor amphitheatre, the Delacorte Theatre, has accommodated these productions. Many celebrity actors have worked the Delacorte.  People often line up in the morning to assure tickets for the evening performance.  Many seasons have featured works by other playwrights, including Bertolt Brecht and Samuel Beckett.

Omaha
Alan Klem, an assistant professor at Creighton University, and Dr. Cindy Phaneuf, then an Assistant Professor of Dramatic Arts at the University of Nebraska at Omaha, founded Nebraska Shakespeare in 1986. Klem previously helped found Shakespeare in the Park in Ft. Worth, TX. Nebraska Shakespeare presents free performances each summer and the shows are staged in Elmwood Park in Omaha, which borders University of Nebraska Omaha. In the fall, Nebraska Shakespeare also tours shorter versions of Shakespeare's plays to schools across Nebraska.

Others 
 The Hudson Warehouse present free Shakespeare and other productions at the Soldiers' and Sailors' Monument in Riverside Park.
 New York Classical Theatre present free Off Broadway Shakespeare productions in New York City's Central Park, Battery Park, Brooklyn Bridge Park, and Carl Schurz Park among other locations. At the end of each scene, audience members participate by following the actors to a new space in the venue.
 Coos Bay Shakespeare in the Park presents a free Shakespeare production in Coos Bay, Oregon's Mingus Park each year.

Philadelphia

This Philadelphia theater company offers the largest, free outdoor production of Shakespeare's plays in the greater Philadelphia area. Shakespeare in Clark Park was formed in the fall of 2005 by Marla Burkholder, Maria Möller, Tom Reing and Whitney Estrin. In their inaugural season, Shakespeare in Clark Park presented four performances of Twelfth Night, drawing an audience of over 2,000 people. Those audiences have grown to over 5,000 and the annual show has become a staple of summer in Philly.

Pittsburgh
Jennifer Tober founded Pittsburgh Shakespeare in the Parks in 2005. Their performances are free and utilize various public parks in the Pittsburgh area.

Rochester
The Rochester Community Players have staged free Shakespeare productions at the Highland Bowl in Highland Park each July since 1997.

Saint Louis
St. Louis Shakespeare Festival began in 2001 and produced the first annual free Shakespeare festival in Forest Park with a production of Romeo and Juliet. Since the initial two-week run that attracted 33,000 audience members, the Festival has grown into a year-round institution producing over 250 public performances annually for nearly 100,000 patrons and students.

San Francisco
Free Shakespeare in the Park began in San Francisco in 1983, with its debut production of The Tempest in Golden Gate Park. Produced every year in San Francisco, Pleasanton, Cupertino, and Redwood City from July through September, this program stages professional theater free of charge throughout the San Francisco Bay Area.

San Pedro
Shakespeare by the Sea was launched in 1998 by Producing Artistic Director Lisa Coffi. It presents free Shakespeare productions in San Pedro, Los Angeles and throughout Los Angeles, Orange and Ventura Counties.

Seattle
Since 1989, GreenStage has been producing free Shakespeare in major parks in and around Seattle. In 2014, they completed the entire Shakespeare canon.

In 1994, a theater company called the Wooden O started annual summer Shakespeare performances at the Luther Burbank Amphitheater on Mercer Island, Washington. In later years park venues including Lynnwood, Washington and Auburn, Washington were added. In the spring of 2008 the Seattle Shakespeare Company merged with Wooden O and continues to present free Shakespeare productions throughout the Puget Sound region.

South Dakota
The South Dakota Shakespeare Festival (SDSF) was formed in 2011 and launched its inaugural season in Vermillion, South Dakota, in June 2012. Since the summer of 2012 the SDSF has been offering fully produced professional Shakespeare performances in Vermillion's Prentis Park and daytime arts educational offerings for youth and adults.

Tallahassee
The Southern Shakespeare Festival occurs annually in Tallahassee, Florida. The festival's first incarnation existed from 1995 to 2000. In 2012 a group of scholars saw an opportunity to revive the free outdoor festival at the award-winning Cascades Park.

Westfield, NJ
Troupe of Friends offers free outdoor Shakespearean performances in Westfield, New Jersey. The shows are typical staged at Mindowaskin Park on Labor Day weekend. The company was formed in 2006 by Artistic Director Joseph Penczak. Among the shows they have produced are The Comedy of Errors, Twelfth Night, Henry IV Part One, Julius Caesar, The Merry Wives of Windsor, Richard 2, The Taming of the Shrew, King Lear, Waiting For Godot, and Endgame.

Australia

Australian Shakespeare Company (Melbourne)

The Australian Shakespeare Company was founded in 1987 by Glenn Elston, the man responsible for pioneering outdoor theatre performances of William Shakespeare's plays in Australia. The company has performed for more than a million people across all the different regions of Australia. They make it a mission to draw audiences of all age groups to their shows.

Shakespeare in the Park Festival at Toowoomba
The Shakespeare in the Park Festival at Toowoomba is another location for al fresco Shakespeare performances in Australia. Originally presented in Toowoomba's Queen's Park (2004-2011), this festival recently moved (2012) to the University of Southern Queensland's Toowoomba campus. Presentations on the open-air mainstage since the festival's inception in 2004 include The Tempest, Romeo and Juliet, Macbeth, Comedy of Errors, Taming of the Shrew, Hamlet, Twelfth Night and A Midsummer Night's Dream. Cast includes Creative Arts students from the University of Southern Queensland and also includes a variety of other events to complement the mainstage offering each year.

Shakespeare WA (Perth)
Western Australia also holds a large Shakespeare in the Park festival in Perth at King's Park Botanical Gardens. The plays for this festival are set to be performed by the same company (Shakespeare WA) through 2014. This festival is usually held from mid January to mid February, and is the largest single theatre event in Western Australia.

Shakespeare by the Lakes (Canberra)

Shakespeare by the Lakes is a summer festival of free Shakespeare plays, produced by theatre company Lakespeare & Co. (established by Founder and Executive Producer Taimus Werner-Gibbings and collaborators Duncan Driver, Lexi Sekuless and Paul Leverenz), and attracting over 5,000 patrons to ACT public parks.

New Zealand
Wellington

Summer Shakespeare has been an annual outdoor theatre event in the capital city, Wellington, since 1983. The large-scale, large-cast productions have taken place in a variety of settings including the Dell in the Wellington Botanic Gardens, Civic Square, Museum of New Zealand Te Papa Tongarewa, onsite at Victoria University and at Gladstone Vineyard in the Wairarapa. Productions have ranged from some of the most popular to some of the most obscure plays in the Shakespeare canon.

Auckland

Shakespeare in the Park has been performed in the outdoor amphitheatre at The PumpHouse Theatre, Lake Pupuke since 1996. incorporating traditional costumes and settings.

Canada

The Dream in High Park (Toronto)

The Dream in High Park is the oldest annual outdoor theatre event in Canada, currently entering its 33rd season in 2016. Since its inception in 1983, an estimated 1.3 million people have enjoyed the tradition of theatre under the stars. The Canadian Stage Company, who performs the Dream, is nationally and internationally acclaimed, and is Canada's leading not-for-profit contemporary theatre company. It was founded in 1987 with the merger of CentreStage and Toronto Free Theatre, and is dedicated to programming international contemporary theatre, and to developing and producing landmark Canadian works.

Shakespeare In The Ruff (Toronto)
Shakespeare In The Ruff was born from the ashes from the previous company Shakespeare In The Rough which performed in Toronto's East End neighbourhood of Riverdale between 1994 and 2006. The new company launched in 2012 focuses on creating unique contemporary adaptations of Shakespeare's work and providing opportunities for emerging artists. As part of the company's community work, they run a youth apprenticeship program called the Young Ruffians which pairs up high school students with a member of the professional company for the duration of rehearsals and performances.

Shakespeare by the Sea Festival (St. John's)
Shakespeare by the Sea Festival Inc., a community-based organization, produces and promotes artistic works with a focus on William Shakespeare. It unites seasoned and developing talent and aspires to excel in all aspects. The festival is the longest-running outdoor summer theatre event in the St. John's area. Since 1993, the Shakespeare by the Sea Festival has been performing the works of the famous Bard all around the St. John's area – from the cliff-top meadows of Logy Bay to the historic World War II bunkers at Cape Spear – from the cobblestoned courtyard of the Murray Premises to the lush landscapes of Bowring Park. Since that time, the Festival has grown into a much-anticipated annual event.

Repercussion Theatre (Montreal)
Repercussion Theatre has been touring parks throughout Montreal for over 25 years, bringing the classics to people where they live, for free (with donations graciously accepted). They are experienced in providing Shakespeare in the Park across the city, entertaining people who may otherwise not be exposed to live theatre. Repercussion Theatre was founded in 1988, when they played four shows in front of 800 people in Beaconsfield, Qc. Now, they perform to over 10,000 people each summer across the island of Montreal and beyond – with a commitment to cultural diversity, gender equity, and infusing Shakespeare's plays with a decidedly Montreal flair. They are the only company in Montreal to consistently produce a Shakespeare production each year. The company's first artistic director was Cas Anvar (followed by Kevin Orr and then Paul Hopkins) and the current artistic director is Amanda Kellock.

A Company of Fools (Ottawa)
In 1990, Margo MacDonald and Heather Jopling, rooted in the belief that Shakespeare should be seen and not read, recruited almost a dozen young performers and took to the streets. They derived inspiration from the rogue Elizabethan players that once entertained audiences outdoors at the Globe theatre, named themselves A Company of Fools, and began performing for crowds on the streets of Ottawa. In 1998 the Fools began performing in Ottawa City Parks with college shows, and in 2002 the Fools launched the Torchlight Shakespeare series. Besides mounting an average of two productions a year, the Fools hold three annual events (Twelfth Night Celebration, Valentine's Day Sonnet Delivery, and the Ottawa Theatre Challenge) and are active in the Ottawa community.

Shakespeare in the Ruins (Winnipeg)
Shakespeare in the Ruins (SIR) is Manitoba's only professional Shakespeare company. The company was founded in 1993 and is noted for its productions at Trappist Monastery Provincial Park.

Shakespeare on the Saskatchewan 

Shakespeare on the Saskatchewan was founded in 1985 in Saskatoon, Saskatchewan.  The plays are staged in tents with a seating capacity of approximately 275 on the banks of the Saskatchewan River, and take place from early July to mid-August.  The festival traditionally offers two main stage performances and occasionally produces a third offering.  The festival sees over 12,000 patrons each year.

Freewill Shakespeare Festival (Edmonton)
The Freewill Shakespeare Festival, formerly known as the River City Shakespeare Festival was founded in 1989. It is produced by the Edmonton, Alberta-based "Free Will Players" every summer from late June to mid July. The Festival includes full-scale professional productions of two plays by William Shakespeare, as well as Camp Shakespeare

The Bard on the Beach (Vancouver)
Bard on the Beach Shakespeare Festival was established in 1990. The plays are staged in Vanier Park on Vancouver's waterfront, in open-ended tents, from the end of May through September. Over the years Bard on the Beach attendance has grown significantly from 6,000 patrons in 1990 to more than 90,000 patrons in 2009. The programming has of course expanded from one play to four, and from 34 performances to 215 two decades later.

The Bard's Bus Tour (Ontario)
Driftwood Theatre is Ontario's leading outdoor summer touring theatre company, on the road with The Bard's Bus Tour visiting Ontario communities since 1995. Driftwood Theatre breaks down barriers to experiencing and participating in theatre art by bringing theatre and engagement opportunities to audiences in Ontario who may not have access to professional performance.

Europe

Shakespeare in the Park currently takes place throughout many European countries. In Europe, ever since the Elizabethan period, theatre has  been a crucial part of their cultural heritage and history. The Shakespearean performances take place mostly all over Europe from the East to Central Europe. One of the three Globe Theatres is located in Germany and is called "The Globe Neuss". It was founded in 1991 and is famous for its annual International Shakespeare Festival, where companies from all over the world come to perform.

The German city of Bremen hosts The Bremer Shakespeare Company, which features the largest Shakespearean repertoire on a German stage. Performances at Bremen's Bürgerpark are a cultural attraction each year, and the festival also lets guests participate in The Dramatikerwerkstatt – a playwright workshop.

The Footsbarn Theatre Company based in France is a travelling troupe who perform outdoor theatre all over the world.

In Italy, The Globe Theatre is located within the museum park in Villa Borghese. The stage is a classical "wooden o" structure, reminiscent of the original Globe stage, and is perfect for staging Elizabethan style productions.

Brussels Shakespeare Society based in Belgium has been performing "al fresco" productions of Shakespeare's plays since the summer of 1976.

Theatrum Gedanense Foundation annually organizes the International Shakespeare Festival in Gdańsk, Poland. A week-long festival of outdoor plays and events, the company strives to include not only Polish adaptations of Shakespeare plays, but foreign ones as well.

The British Shakespeare Company; this Leeds-based festival attracts 15 000 people each summer and is also responsible for helping to initiate a government policy to send "Shakespeare Packs" to school children of all ages and backgrounds, in an effort to introduce Shakespeare at a young age.

London's Regent's Park is a very special place for an outdoor Shakespeare experience, as the original productions of these great works took place in this very city and is the host of one of London's summer attractions. Since being first established in 1932 with the very first production of Twelfth Night, the Open Air Theatre has been the home of many seasons of Shakespeare; but also has staged other classical plays, operas, musicals and family shows, becoming a famous tourist location, where many locals and tourists alike gather to see performances. It is one of the largest auditoria in London and the oldest outdoor theatre in all of Britain hosting over 130,000 people annually in its sixteen-week season.

The Cambridge Shakespeare Festival; this Festival holds eight plays every summer and is one of the UK's most popular and oldest outdoor Shakespeare companies. Established by David Crilly, it stages authentic Shakespeare in the Cambridge University's college grounds. Audiences can reach up to 1000 people per show, particularly for performances of A Midsummer Night's Dream.

The Willow Globe Theatre; this replica Globe Theatre in Wales is built entirely from living willow trees. It stages productions throughout the summer with an ecological and sustainable focus.

The Minack Theatre; this outdoor amphitheater in Cornwall has views of the sea and stages Shakespeare productions throughout the summer.

See also
 Kentucky Shakespeare Festival
 Oklahoma Shakespeare in the Park
 Hudson Warehouse
 Nashville Shakespeare Festival

References

Lists of theatre festivals